Aybek Altynbekov (born 12 January 1978) is a Kyrgyz politician, and current member of the Supreme Council of Kyrgyzstan.

Early life and education
Altynbekov was born on 12 January 1978 in the village of Köktöndü in Jalad-Abad Oblast in the Kirgiz SSR, now Kyrgyzstan. In 2000 he graduated from Osh State University with a degree in jurisprudence, while also completing his service at the university's military department, leaving as a junior lieutenant.

Career

Legal consultant and company director, 2001–2015
Altynbekov started work in 2001 as a legal consultant at a company named "Jarkynay". Between 2010 and 2011 he was general director of a security agency called "Jyldyzbek" and between 2011 and 2015 he was the general director of a company called "Zolotoy Orekh" (in English means "Golden Nut").

Jogorku Kenesh deputy, 2015–present
Altynbekov was elected as deputy for the Respublika–Ata Zhurt in the 2015 parliamentary election.

Personal life
Altynbekov is married, and has 4 children.

See also
List of members of the Supreme Council (Kyrgyzstan), 2015–present

References

Living people
1978 births
People from Jalal-Abad Region
Members of the Supreme Council (Kyrgyzstan)
Osh State University alumni